Jairo Andrés Mosquera Mendoza (born May 2, 1986) is a Colombian footballer, who currently plays for Unión Magdalena in the Categoría Primera B.

Teams
 Deportivo Pereira 2008
 Guaraní 2009–2011
 Spartaks Jūrmala 2011–2013
 → Salyut Belgorod 2012-2013 (loan)
 Real Cartagena 2013-present

Titles
 Guaraní 2010 (Torneo Apertura)

References

External links
 Profile at BDFA 
 

1986 births
Living people
Footballers from Medellín
Colombian footballers
Colombian expatriate footballers
Deportivo Pereira footballers
Club Guaraní players
Expatriate footballers in Paraguay
FK Spartaks Jūrmala players
Expatriate footballers in Latvia
FC Salyut Belgorod players
Expatriate footballers in Russia
Real Cartagena footballers
Unión Magdalena footballers
Association football forwards